Darlington Omodiagbe (born 2 July 1978 in Warri) is a Nigerian football midfielder playing currently for SV Wacker Burghausen. Omodiagbe has played in Germany for much of his career, with spells in Poland. In the 2010–11 season he was relegated from the 3. Liga with SV Wacker Burghausen, which was his fifth relegation in five seasons, each with a different club. He had previously gone down with Rot Weiss Ahlen (2009–10), VfL Osnabrück (2008–09), Carl Zeiss Jena (2007–08), and SpVgg Unterhaching (2006–07). Each of these previous four relegations had been from the 2. Bundesliga. He had also been relegated from this level in 1998–99, with FC Gütersloh.

References

External links
 

Living people
1978 births
Nigerian footballers
ŁKS Łódź players
Expatriate footballers in Poland
Hannover 96 players
MSV Duisburg players
SpVgg Unterhaching players
FC Carl Zeiss Jena players
VfL Osnabrück players
FC Gütersloh 2000 players
Rot Weiss Ahlen players
SV Wacker Burghausen players
2. Bundesliga players
3. Liga players
Expatriate footballers in Germany
Sportspeople from Warri
Nigerian expatriate sportspeople in Poland
Nigerian expatriate footballers
Association football midfielders